Charles-Andreas Brym (born August 8, 1998) is a professional soccer player who plays as a forward for Eerste Divisie club FC Eindhoven, on loan from Sparta Rotterdam. Born in France, he represents the Canada national team.

Early life
Born in France to a Togolese father and a Corsican mother, Brym moved to Montreal in Canada with his family and spent his early years there. He holds French and Canadian citizenships. In 2011, he joined the youth academy of Montreal Impact as one of their first academy recruits. He returned to France to further his soccer career in 2013 with Gazélec Ajaccio. After one season there, he moved to Belgium.

Club career

Lille
On July 4, 2018, Brym signed a professional contract with Ligue 1 club Lille.

In July 2019, Brym was loaned to Belenenses SAD of the Primeira Liga. He made his debut for Belenenses on August 30 against Boavista. In July 2020, Brym joined his former club Mouscron in Belgium on loan.

FC Eindhoven
In August 2021 Brym signed for Eerste Divisie club FC Eindhoven, on a one-year contract with an option for a second season. He made his debut for the club on September 5 in a 4–2 loss to ADO Den Haag, coming 59th-minute substitute for Jort van der Sande. On September 13, he scored his first goal in a 3–2 win over Helmond Sport after an assist by Joey Sleegers.

Sparta Rotterdam
On May 31, 2022, Brym signed with Eredivisie club Sparta Rotterdam. He made his debut on August 14 against AZ as a late substitute in a 3-2 defeat. On August 29 Sparta Rotterdam announced Brym had been loaned to his former club FC Eindhoven for the remainder of the season.

International career

Youth
Brym was named to the Canadian under-23 provisional roster for the 2020 CONCACAF Men's Olympic Qualifying Championship on February 26, 2020. He was named to the final squad on March 10, 2021.

Senior
In January 2020, Brym was called up to the Canadian national team ahead of friendlies against Barbados and Iceland. On January 7, he made his debut as a substitute against Barbados and scored his first goal three days later in a rematch against Barbados.

Career statistics

International

Scores and results list Canada's goal tally first, score column indicates score after each Brym goal.

References

External links
 

1998 births
Living people
Sportspeople from Colombes
Footballers from Hauts-de-Seine
Association football forwards
Canadian soccer players
Canada men's international soccer players
French footballers
Canadian people of Togolese descent
French sportspeople of Togolese descent
French people of Corsican descent
French emigrants to Quebec
Canadian expatriate soccer players
French expatriate footballers
Expatriate footballers in Belgium
Canadian expatriate sportspeople in Belgium
French expatriate sportspeople in Belgium
Expatriate footballers in Portugal
Canadian expatriate sportspeople in Portugal
French expatriate sportspeople in Portugal
Expatriate footballers in the Netherlands
Canadian expatriate sportspeople in the Netherlands
French expatriate sportspeople in the Netherlands
Gazélec Ajaccio players
Royal Excel Mouscron players
S.V. Zulte Waregem players
Lille OSC players
Belenenses SAD players
FC Eindhoven players
Sparta Rotterdam players
Championnat National 2 players
Primeira Liga players
Eerste Divisie players